Jiří Janák (born August 1, 1983 in Olomouc) is a Czech auto racing driver.

Career
Janák began competing in the Czech Skoda Octavia Cup in 2003. He progressed to win the series in 2005 and 2006.

In 2005 he competed in selected rounds of the Megane Trophy Eurocup. In 2006 he competed in the first round of the World Touring Car Championship for Československý Motorsport. He also competed in the Porsche Carrera Cup Germany in 2006.

In 2007 Janák began competing in the Porsche Supercup alongside his Carrera Cup Germany campaign, and currently competes in both series.

Racing record

Complete World Touring Car Championship results
(key) (Races in bold indicate pole position) (Races in italics indicate fastest lap)

Complete Porsche Supercup results
(key) (Races in bold indicate pole position – 2 points awarded 2008 onwards in all races) (Races in italics indicate fastest lap)

Complete FIA GT Championship results

Complete GT1 World Championship results

References

External links
Official website

Living people
1983 births
Sportspeople from Olomouc
Czech racing drivers
World Touring Car Championship drivers
FIA GT1 World Championship drivers
Porsche Supercup drivers
Porsche Carrera Cup Germany drivers